Lobelia purpurascens, commonly known as white root or purplish pratia, is a flowering plant in the family Campanulaceae   of eastern Australia. It is a small herbaceous, scrambling plant with white to pale pink flowers.

Description

Taxonomy and naming
Lobelia purpurascens was first formally described in 1810 by Robert Brown and the description was published in Prodromus florae Novae Hollandiae et insulae Van-Diemen, exhibens characteres plantarum quas annis 1802-1805. The specific epithet (purpurascens) means "purplish".

Distribution and habitat
White root grows mostly in shady, moist situations in woodland and grasslands in New South Wales, Queensland and Victoria.

References

Flora of Victoria (Australia)
Flora of New South Wales
Flora of Queensland
purpurascens
Asterales of Australia